Opus IV is the third studio album release by black metal band Abigor. It was released in 1996.

Track listing 

 "Crimson Horizons and Ashen Skies" - 6:06
 "Eerie Constellation" - 5:35
 "Mirages for the Eyes of the Blind" - 5:37
 "A Breath from Worlds Beyond" - 4:53
 "The Elder God (My Dragon Magic)" - 6:42
 "Dimensions of Thy Unforgotten Sins/Part 1" - 4:11
 "Dimensions of Thy Unforgotten Sins/Part 2" - 4:27
 "Spektrale Schattenlichter" - 4:55

1996 albums
Abigor albums
Napalm Records albums